Nasser Saleh Nasser Al Yazidi (born 2 February 2000), is a Qatari professional footballer who plays as a midfielder for Qatar Stars League side Al-Wakrah.

Club career
Al Yazidi made his debut in a 2–2 draw with Al-Shahania, replacing Almoez Ali at half time.

Career statistics

Club

Notes

References

External links

2000 births
Living people
Qatari footballers
Lekhwiya SC players
Al-Duhail SC players
Al Ahli SC (Doha) players
Umm Salal SC players
Al-Wakrah SC players
Qatar Stars League players
Association football midfielders
People from Doha
Qatar under-20 international footballers